Leonard Parkin (2 June 1929 – 20 September 1993) was a British television journalist and newscaster who worked for both the BBC and ITN.

Born in Thurnscoe, West Riding of Yorkshire, he was educated at Hemsworth Grammar School, Yorkshire. He worked as a reporter on the BBC's Panorama for many years before joining ITN, initially as a reporter but later as a newscaster for ITV's main early evening bulletins in the 1970s. In November 1963, he was deputy correspondent for the BBC in Washington and his Radio Newsreel report on the assassination of John F. Kennedy is a historic recording. Between 1976 and 1987 he was, along with Peter Sissons, one of the main presenters for ITN's News at One, and often hosted the News at 5:45 in the late 1970s and early 1980s. He regularly presented News at Ten from October 1967, shortly after its launch, until January 1976.

Parkin was one of the most popular newsreaders ever to work for ITN, and, like his former co-host of the News at 5:45 Michael Nicholson, he became renowned for his cheerful and friendly disposition. He always began the News at One by saying "hello, good afternoon.." then reading the headlines. During school holidays, he would also make a point of welcoming younger viewers at the start of the News at One. When he presented News at 5:45 on 24 October 1979, he was the first ITN newscaster to be seen on ITV following the conclusion of the ITV strike of August–October 1979.

During the Falklands War of 1982, Parkin temporarily replaced Michael Nicholson as main presenter of the News at 5:45, and broke to the UK the news that the General Belgrano had been sunk in a controversial incident during the Falklands War. He and Nicholson provided a detailed report of this incident. He left ITN in 1987, returning to his native Yorkshire to make a series of documentaries about the county for Yorkshire Television, entitled Pieces of Parkin.

A Freemason, he was a member of a Lodge which met at The Cloisters in Letchworth Garden City.

Parkin died of cancer of the spine, in Scarborough, on 20 September 1993.

References

1929 births
1993 deaths
British male journalists
Freemasons of the United Grand Lodge of England
ITN newsreaders and journalists
People from Thurnscoe
Television personalities from South Yorkshire
Deaths from cancer in England
Neurological disease deaths in England
Deaths from spinal cancer